Raindrops are drops of atmospheric liquid water, per precipitation.

It may also refer to:

 The Raindrops, a New York pop group
 Frédéric Chopin's Prelude, Op. 28, No. 15 (Raindrop)
 "Raindrops" (Basement Jaxx song), 2009
 "Raindrops" (Dee Clark song), 1961
 "Raindrops (Encore Une Fois)", a mashup by Sash!
 "Raindrops (Insane)", a song by Metro Boomin and Travis Scott
 "Raindrops" (Stunt song), 2006
 "Raindrops", a song by Jeremih from the album Jeremih
 "Raindrops", a 2006 song by Pitbull featuring Anjuli Stars from the album El Mariel
 "Raindrops (An Angel Cried)", a song by Ariana Grande from the album Sweetener
 "Rain Drop" (IU song), 2010
 Raindrops, the reissue of the album Steve Kuhn Live in New York
 Mozilla Raindrop, a messaging application

See also
 Raindrop cake, a type of dessert